Angelo Cinico, best known as Cinico Angelini (12 November 1901 – 7 July 1983), was an Italian conductor, arranger and violinist.

Life and career 

After his studies at the Giuseppe Verdi Conservatory in Turin, Angelini started his career as jazz violinist in various ensembles. In 1925 he moved to Venezuela, where he stayed 5 years and made a name for himself as a conductor. Returned in Italy in 1930, he got a contract with the major dance hall of the time, Sala Gay in Turin, and he became so famous as to be employed as conductor of the EIAR orchestra and to be often asked to perform for Prince Umberto II.

Angelini Orchestra

During these years the press put often him in contraposition with Pippo Barzizza, with Angelini rapresenting the more traditional, melodic style against the more modern, swinging style of Barzizza. He directed the orchestra at the first eight editions of the Sanremo Music Festival. He retired in the early 1960s.

References

External links 
  Salvatore De Salvo (1988). "Cinico, Angelo". Dizionario Biografico degli Italiani,  Volume 34 (in Italian). Rome: Istituto dell'Enciclopedia Italiana. 

1901 births
1983 deaths
People from Crescentino
Italian conductors (music)
Italian music arrangers